Eve is a nude sculpture by the French artist Auguste Rodin. It shows Eve despairing after the Fall.

Gates of Hell

In 1880 Rodin was commissioned to produce The Gates of Hell, for which he exhibited Adam at the 1881 Paris Salon. In a sketch for Gates Rodin showed a central silhouette possibly intended as Eve (both the sketch and Gates are now in the Musée Rodin), but in October 1881 he decided to produce Eve as a pair for Adam, with the two sculptures flanking a huge high-relief bas-relief. This would be the first free-standing female sculpture he had produced since the destruction of his Bacchante in an accident between 1864 and 1870.

Work
He began Eve in 1881, later abandoning his intended colossal version of it when he realised his model, probably Adèle Abruzzesi, was pregnant. It was first exhibited to the public at the 1899 Paris Salon. It shows a strong influence from Michelangelo, picked up by Rodin in Italy in 1876.

He also produced an autograph white marble version in 1884 (now in the Museo Soumaya in Mexico City), a version in patinated plaster and a much-reproduced 71 cm high bronze version in 1883 (known as the Petite Ève or Little Eve, whose original is also in the Musée Rodin in Paris). He also reused the same figure of Eve in his marble Eve and the Serpent (1901) and his plaster Adam and Eve (1884).

See also
List of sculptures by Auguste Rodin

References

External links

1880s sculptures
Sculptures by Auguste Rodin
Sculptures of the Museo Soumaya
Bronze sculptures
Marble sculptures
Nude sculptures
Sculptures of the Musée Rodin
Cultural depictions of Adam and Eve